Rožďalovice is a town in Nymburk District in the Central Bohemian Region of the Czech Republic. It has about 1,600 inhabitants.

Administrative parts
Villages of Hasina, Ledečky, Podlužany, Podolí, Viničná Lhota and Zámostí are administrative parts of Rožďalovice.

Geography
It lies in the Central Elbe Table. The Štítarský Stream flows through the municipal territory.

History
The first written mention of Rožďalovice is from 1223. Around 1340, the village was promoted to a town by King John of Bohemia. The most important owners of Rožďalovice, during whose rule the town flourished, were the Křinecký of Ronov family
(end of the 15th century – 1622), the Waldstein family (1622–1760) and the Lobkowicz family (1815–1930).

Transport
Rožďalovice is located on the railway line Nymburk–Jičín.

Sights
The Rožďalovice Castle is originally a Renaissance building. It was built in 1622 and rebuilt in the Baroque style in 1760, when the clock tower was also added. Further modifications were made in 1935–1938. The sculptural decoration comes from Michael Brokoff. The castle is surrounded by a castle park and gardens. Today it houses a retirement home and is inaccessible to the public.

The Church of Saint Gall was built in the Baroque style in 1725–1734. It was built on the site of an old Gothic demolished church.

Notable people
Jiří Melantrich of Aventino (c. 1511–1580), printer and publisher
Oskar Hekš (1908–1944), long-distance runner

Gallery

References

External links

Cities and towns in the Czech Republic